The Stele of Ankh-ef-en-Khonsu (also known as the Stele of Revealing) is a painted, wooden offering stele located in Cairo, Egypt. It was discovered in 1858 by François Auguste Ferdinand Mariette at the mortuary temple of the 18th Dynasty Pharaoh Hatshepsut, located at Dayr al-Bahri. It was originally made for the Montu-priest Ankh-ef-en-Khonsu i,  and was discovered near his coffin ensemble of two sarcophagi and two anthropomorphic inner coffins. It dates to circa 680–70 BCE, the period of the late 25th Dynasty/early 26th Dynasty. Originally located in the former Bulaq Museum under inventory number 666, the stele was moved around 1902 to the newly opened Egyptian Museum of Cairo (inventory number A 9422; Temporary Register Number 25/12/24/11), where it remains today.

The stele is made of wood and covered with a plaster gesso, which has been painted. It measures 51.5 centimeters high and 31 centimeters wide. On the front, Ankh-ef-en-Khonsu can be seen as a priest of Montu; he is presenting offerings to the falcon-headed god Re-Harakhty ("Re-Horus of the Two Horizons"), a syncretic form of the gods Ra and Horus, who is seated on a throne. The symbol of the west, the place of the Dead, is seen behind Re-Harakhty. Above the figures is a depiction of Nut, the sky goddess who stretches from horizon to horizon. Directly beneath her is the Winged Solar Disk, Horus of Behdet.

The stele is also known as the "Stele of Revealing" and is a central element of the religious philosophy Thelema founded by Aleister Crowley.

Origins 
The stele is a fairly typical example of a late Third Intermediate Period Theban offering stele dating to the late 25th Dynasty/early 26th Dynasty. It was discovered in 1854 as part of a large burial of priests of Montu at Dayr al-Bahri, and included the coffin of the dedicant, Ankh-ef-en-Khonsu.

Text 
The stele is painted on both faces with Egyptian texts, some of which are Chapter 91 of the Egyptian Book of the Dead, while the back of the stele records eleven lines of text from Chapters 30 and 2.

The text reads as follows.

Obverse 

[A1] Beneath the Winged Solar Disk: (He of) Behdet, the Great God, Lord of Heaven

[A2–A3] Above Re-Harakhty: Re-Harakhty ("Re-Horus of the Two Horizons"), Chief of the Gods

[A4–A8] Above Ankh-ef-en-Khonsu: The Osiris, God's Servant of Montu, Lord of Waset, Opener of the Door-leaves of Heaven in the Most Select of Places (i.e., Karnak), Ankh-ef-en-Khonsu, <True of> Voice

[A9] Beneath the offering table: (thousands of) Bread and beer, cattle and fowl

[B1–B5] Main text: [B1] Words spoken by the Osiris (i.e., the deceased), God's Servant of Montu, Lord of Waset, Opener of the Door-leaves of Heaven in the Most Select of Places (i.e., Karnak), Ankh-ef-en-Khonsu, [B2] True of Voice: "O Exalted-one! may he be praised, Great of Manifestations, the great Ba whom [B3] the gods fear, and who appears on his great throne, make the path of the Ba, the Akh, and the Shadow, for I am equipped so that (I) might shine therein [B4] (as) an equipped-one. Make for me the path to the place in which Re, Atum, Khepri, and Hathor are therein." The Osiris, God's Servant of Montu, Lord of Waset, [B5] Ankh-ef-en-Khonsu, <True of> Voice, son of the like titled Ba-sa-en-Mut, borne of the Chantress of Amun-Re, Lady of the House, Ta-nesh<et>.

Reverse 

[C1] Words spoken by the Osiris (i.e., the deceased), God's Servant of Montu, Lord of Waset, Ankh-ef-en- [C2] Khonsu, True of Voice: "(O) my heart of my mother [2 times], (O) my heart while I existed [C3] upon earth, do not stand against me as a witness, do not oppose me in [C4] in the tribunal, do not be hostile against me in the presence of the Great God, Lord of the West. [C5] Although I have united (myself) to the land to the great western side of Heaven, may I flourish upon earth!" [C6] Words spoken by the Osiris, the Stolist of Waset, Ankh-ef-en-Khonsu, True of Voice: O (you who are) Unique [C7] of Arm, who shines like the moon, the Osiris, Ankh-ef- [C8] en-Khonsu, goes forth from your multitudes, [C9] (O) deliverer of those who are within the sun-light, open for him [C10] the Netherworld, indeed, the Osiris, Ankh-ef-en-Khonsu who goes forth in [C11] day in order to do everything all that pleased him upon earth among the living-ones."

Influence on Crowley
The designation of this object as the Stele of Revealing was given in April 1904 by the occultist Aleister Crowley, in connection with his Book of the Law.

According to Crowley, his wife Rose had already reported a revelation from the god Horus, through the messenger Aiwass. The couple went to the newly opened Egyptian Museum (where the stela had been moved), to see if she could recognize Horus on Monday, March 21, 1904. Rose recognized an image of the god on this painted stele, which at the time bore the catalogue number 666, a number holding religious significance in Thelema.

According to Crowley, the stela depicts the three chief deities of Thelema: Nuit (Egyptian Nut), Hadit (Egyptian Behdety), and Ra-Hoor-Khuit (Egyptian Re-Harakhty ["Re-Horus of the Two Horizons"]).

Crowley states that he dined with the Egyptologist Émile Charles Albert Brugsch bey, Curator of the Bulaq Museum to discuss the stele in his charge and to arrange for a facsimile to be made. According to Crowley, Brugsch's French assistant curator translated the hieroglyphic text on the stele. In 1912 a second translation was later made for Crowley by Alan Gardiner and Battiscombe Gunn.

References

External links 
Boulaq Museum

7th-century BC steles
1858 archaeological discoveries
Ankhefenkhonsu
Egyptian Museum
Thelemite texts
Individual wooden objects